Fritz Böttger (1902–1981) was a German actor, screenwriter and film director.

Selected filmography

Actor
 Escape in the Dark (1939)
 Men Are That Way (1939)
 The Three Codonas (1940)
 Love Premiere (1943)
 My Wife Theresa (1943)
 Titanic (1943)
 Nights on the Nile (1949)
 When Men Cheat (1950)

Writer
 The Orplid Mystery (1950)
 The Forester's Daughter (1952)
 Pension Schöller (1952)
 Lavender (1953)
 Mask in Blue (1953)
 Love and Trumpets (1954)
 Father's Day (1955)
 The Beautiful Master (1956)
 The Hunter from Roteck (1956)
 The Beggar Student (1956)
 The Count of Luxemburg (1957)
 Just Once a Great Lady (1957)
 The Blue Sea and You (1959)
 Hula-Hopp, Conny (1959)
 The Forester's Daughter (1962)

Director
 The Bachelor Trap (1953)
 Horrors of Spider Island (1960)

References

Bibliography
 John Howard Reid. Science-fiction & Fantasy Cinema: Classic Films of Horror, Sci-fi & the Supernatural. 2007.

External links

1902 births
1981 deaths
German male film actors
Film people from Thuringia
People from Gera